John Stewart Wallace (1840-1910) was a British Liberal Party politician who represented Limehouse in the East End of London in the House of Commons from 1892 to 1895.

References

External links 
 Hansard

1840 births
1910 deaths
People from Limehouse
Liberal Party (UK) MPs for English constituencies
19th-century English politicians
UK MPs 1892–1895